Lappa is a former municipality in the Rethymno regional unit, Crete, Greece. Since the 2011 local government reform it is part of the municipality Rethymno, of which it is a municipal unit. Population 2,216 (2011). The seat of the municipality was in Episkopi. The municipality's name was a revival of the name of the ancient city of Lappa, now the village of Argyroupoli.

References

Populated places in Rethymno (regional unit)